Borisovo is a rural locality (a selo) in Romanovsky Selsoviet of Oktyabrsky District, Amur Oblast, Russia. The population was 1 as of 2018. There is 1 street.

Geography 
Borisovo is located 14 km northeast of Yekaterinoslavka (the district's administrative centre) by road. Pribrezhny is the nearest rural locality.

References 

Rural localities in Oktyabrsky District, Amur Oblast